Zahira College, Kalmunai (commonly known as Kalmunai Zahira) is a boys national school in Ampara District, Sri Lanka.  It was founded in 1949 as English Junior School by the M. S. Kariapper, Member of Ceylon Parliament.  The college is situated in Sainthamaruthu, in the municipality of Kalmunai. It has been graded as 1AB Super School by Ministry of Education Sri Lanka and it has all the streams of GCE Advanced Level in Sri Lanka - Biological and Physical science, Commerce, Arts and Technology.

In 2004, the school was affected by a tsunami.  The current principal of Kalmunai Zahira is M.I.Jabir Sir

See also
List of schools in Eastern Province, Sri Lanka

References

1949 establishments in Ceylon
Educational institutions established in 1949
Schools in Ampara District